St Martin's Church, Stamford, is a parish church in the Church of England located in Stamford, Lincolnshire, England. The area of the town south of the River Welland was in Northamptonshire until 1889 and is called Stamford Baron or St Martin's.

History

St Martin's Church was founded by the 12th century. It was entirely rebuilt in the Perpendicular style in the 15th century.

The North Chapel houses the tombs of the Cecil family, including monuments to Sir Richard Cecil, William Cecil, first Lord Burghley, and John Cecil, 5th Earl of Exeter.

The church was restored over the course of the nineteenth century, with a new nave roof, lowered floor, extended Burghley Chapel, as well as new oak pews, bells and organ. Later additions in 1920-30s include a new screen and pulpit with carvings by Mahomet Thomas Phillips while working at Bowman & Sons.

The majority of the mediaeval coloured glass was bought by the Earl of Exeter from the Church of the Holy Trinity at Tattershall in 1754.

Properly it is the Church of St Martin Without, Stamford Baron.

Burials include Dutch portrait painter William Wissing (1687), in the churchyard, and Daniel Lambert (1809), in the detached part of the churchyard.

Organ
 
The church has an organ by Bevington dating from 1880. A specification of the organ can be found on the National Pipe Organ Register.

List of organists
 John Speechley ???? – 1833, (afterwards organist of St Paul's Church, Bedford, later organist of Peterborough Cathedral)
 Charles C Noble 1833 – 1836 (afterward organist of St Mary's Church, Nottingham)
 Richard Layton 1836 – ca. 1846 – ca. 1876
  John Clare Billing 1918 – 1921 – ????
Ernest John Charles Warner 1952 – circa 1970
Graham Johnson
Harold Harvey (Also St Mary's)
Gary Seiling (Also St Mary's)
Fergus Black (Also St Mary's)

References

External links

 Stamford Churches
 Music at St Martins

Church of England church buildings in Lincolnshire
12th-century church buildings in England
Grade I listed churches in Lincolnshire
Churches in Stamford, Lincolnshire